The USAC Road Racing Championship was a sports car racing series in the United States held from 1958 until 1962.  The series was organized by the United States Auto Club as a fully professional alternative to the Sports Car Club of America's SCCA National Sports Car Championship.

Champions

External links
World Sports Racing Prototypes: USAC Road Racing Championship archive
Racing Sports Cars: USAC Road Racing Championship archive

 
Usac Road Racing Championship
Usac Road Racing Championship